Filth and Dreams is the sixth studio album by British pop group Swing Out Sister. It was released in Japan in March 1999, and unlike all of their previous studio albums, has not seen release in any other country. This album was their first to not contain any singles.

Track listing
 "Who's Been Sleeping" (4:36)
 "Closer Than the Sun" (3:42)
 "Sugar Free" (4:29)
 "Filth and Dreams" (3:54)
 "Happy When You're High" (5:34)
 "If I Had the Heart" (4:21)
 "When Morning Comes" (4:27)
 "Invisible" (4:26)
 "World Out of Control" (3:59)
 "Make You Stay" (3:57)

All songs written by Andy Connell, Corinne Drewery and Paul Staveley O'Duffy

Personnel
Swing Out Sister
 Corinne Drewery – lead vocals, drum programming (3), background vocals
 Andy Connell - fender jazz bass, hammond c3, paiste hi-hats, acoustic guitar, keyboards, synthesizers, background vocals

Additional Musicians
 Tim Cansfield - electric guitar (5, 7), background vocals
 Paul Staveley O'Duffy - computer programming, sequencing, background vocals

Production
 Paul Staveley O'Duffy - producer, mixing, engineer
 Jason Clift - engineer
 Ben Darlow - engineer
 Ben Ashbourn - assistant engineer
 Greg Fleming - assistant engineer
 Martin Jenkins - assistant engineer
 Olly Meacock - assistant engineer
 Andy Ward - assistant engineer
 Savas Iossifidis - assistant engineer
 James Martin - photography
 Yoshinori Kishi - sleeve design

References

External links

1999 albums
Swing Out Sister albums